Dragon1 EA Method (Dragon1) is an open method for Visual Enterprise Architecture and also an Enterprise Architecture Framework. Dragon1 covers the development of a variety of architectures, such as enterprise, governance, business, information and technical architecture. It also covers solution architecture, reference architectures and security architecture or Human Capital Architecture (HCA).

Overview 
This open EA method for Visual Enterprise Architecture has been developed by Dragon1 Architecture Foundation, from the experience of practicing architecture on projects for clients across Europe. The first version was released in 2003 and was based on the ideas of Mark Paauwe about Enterprise Architecture, Architecture Visualization and Architecture Principles.

Dragon1 EA Method is said to be the following:
 A complete method (Way of Thinking, Way of Working, Way of Representing, Way of Supporting) to create architecture products  (The Open Group)
 Usable as add on to other enterprise architecture frameworks and modelling standards
 Promoting architecture as total concept design discipline
 Focussing architects on producing visual architecture products
 Creating visual architecture products for strategic decision support 
 Using visualizations for the collection of stakeholder requirements
 Suited for guiding fundamental strategic enterprise transformations
 Recognized by ISO
 A recognized architecture method in The Open Group’s IT Architecture Certification program (ITAC). 

Dragon1 is an open method with a documented process for managing RFC's from user community to implementation in the methods body of knowledge.

Key definitions in Dragon1 
The Dragon1 view of architects, architecture, structure, and architecture principles differs from that held by mainstream Enterprise Architecture approaches as it specifies the fundamental roles and purpose of principles and its guiding and defining purpose in the generation of architecture visualization and architecture design.

 Architects in Dragon1 are talented or experienced creative designers of "total-concepts";
 Enterprise Architecture (the total concept of the enterprise) is the coherent set of constructive, operative and decorative business, information & IT concepts that constitute an enterprise-structure;
 Principles are the enforced way things work, producing results;
 Architecture Principles are the way concepts (as part of an architecture) integrally work producing results.

Community
Dragon1 is a living Open EA Method, which originated in the Netherlands and has a growing number of users.

 In the Netherlands there are 200+ companies and 1000+ people using the method. Monthly there is a user community meeting. Current work groups in the community are Business Requirements, Architecture Principles, Business Concepts Library and Big Data. These workgroups will sharpen the method on these topics.
 In other countries such England, Wales, Belgium and Suriname the method is starting to be used at governments and commercial organizations

References

External links 
 Dragon1 wiki by Mark Paauwe and others
 Visualisaties voor Stichting Bibliotheek.NL (in Dutch) by Han van Roosmalen, posted February 13, 2013
 Toepassing van Dragon1 bij verbeteren performce van software voortbrenging (in Dutch) by Siebe van der Veen

Enterprise architecture frameworks